Parsonstown is a townland in County Westmeath, Ireland.

Parsonstown is one of 11 townlands of the civil parish of Tyfarnham in the barony of Corkaree in the Province of Leinster.

The neighbouring townlands are: Martinstown to the north, Sheefin to the north–east, Knockatee to the south–east, Garraree to the south, Kilmaglish to the south–west and Galmoylestown Upper to the north–west.

In the 1911 census of Ireland there were 13 houses and 56 inhabitants in the townland.

References

External links
Map of Parsonstown at openstreetmap.org
Parsonstown at the IreAtlas Townland Data Base
Parsonstown at Townlands.ie
Parsonstown at The Placenames Database of Ireland

Townlands of County Westmeath